Terra Nova is a 1998 Australian film directed by Paul Middleditch and starring Jeanette Cronin and Angela Punch McGregor. The whole story is based on a young woman (Jeanette Cronin) who runs away from her home in New Zealand and hides with her child in an Australian boarding house named Terra Nova.

References

External links

Terra Nova at SBS Movie Show
Terra Nova at Urban Cinefile

Australian drama films
1990s English-language films
1990s Australian films